The 2006 ETU Duathlon European Championships were held in Rimini, Italy from October 7 and October 8, 2006.

Men's results

Individual

Women's results

Individual

External links
Official website

Duathlon competitions
Duathlon
D
D
Triathlon competitions in Italy